USS Itty E (SP-952) was a United States Navy patrol vessel in commission from 1917 to 1918.

Itty E was built as a private open motorboat of the same name in 1916 by Murray and Tregurtha at South Boston, Massachusetts. In 1917, the U.S. Navy - which had evaluated Itty E and concluded that she would be "[e]xcellent as rescue boat or tender to the airplane at Naval Air Station" - chartered her from her owner, F. H. Rawson of Chicago, Illinois, for use as a section patrol boat during World War I. She was commissioned on 6 July 1917 as USS Itty E (SP-952).

Assigned to the 1st Naval District in northern New England, Itty E operated successfully as a fast rescue boat at Naval Air Station Boston, Massachusetts. She was transferred to Norfolk, Virginia, on 20 October 1917, but saw little service there because of a need for extensive engine repairs. Her engine had been removed and was under repair in a facility ashore when it was burned in July 1918, resulting in Itty E being declared a constructive total loss. She was taken to the Washington Navy Yard in Washington, D.C., in October 1918 and scrapped there in 1920.

Notes

References

Department of the Navy Naval History and Heritage Command Online Library of Selected Images: Civilian Ships: Itty E (Motor Boat, 1916); Later USS Itty E (SP-952), 1917-1920
NavSource Online: Section Patrol Craft Photo Archive Itty E (SP 952)

Patrol vessels of the United States Navy
World War I patrol vessels of the United States
Ships built in Boston
1916 ships